Amanita longipes is a small inedible mushroom species of the Amanita genus.  It feeds on decaying leaves of some woods and can be found around the Appalachian Mountains.  It is a food source for various insects.

Description

Cap 
The cap is typically around 24 – 102 mm (2.4 – 10.2 cm) wide, is hemispheric at first then becoming broadly convex to plano-convex, occasionally also slightly depressed in center; white, pallid grayish-brown or grayish buff over disk in age, surface dull and tacky at first and becoming shiny.

Gills 
The gills are usually narrowly adnate, sometimes with a decurrent line, close, whitish, becoming grayish-cream on drying, with white, floccose remnants of partial veil on edges, narrow, 4.511 mm (0.451.1 cm) broad, sometimes anastomosing; the short gills are truncate to rounded truncate to attenuate to attenuate in steps, plentiful, of diverse lengths, unevenly distributed.

Stem 
The stem is 25 – 142 (2.5 – 14.2 cm) × 5 – 20 mm (0.5 – 2 cm), white, and tapers upward slightly to a flaring apex.  The stem is decorated with easily removed, floccose material especially in upper portion; the flesh of the stem usually does not take on a color when bruised.  The flesh is white, occasionally graying in damaged areas, with a firmly stuffed central cylinder, up to 7 mm wide. The ring is fibrous-floccose and rapidly evanescent. Volval remnants are absent from the bulb and the stem base or difficult to distinguish.

Toxicity
One guide lists this species' edibility as unknown but doubtful. It should be avoided as many species of the genus are deadly.

References 

longipes